Ann Shirley Jones,  (née Adrianne Haydon on 17 October 1938, also known as Ann Haydon-Jones) is a British former table tennis and lawn tennis champion. She won eight Grand Slam tennis championships in her career: three in singles, three in women's doubles, and two in mixed doubles. As of 2023, she serves as a vice president of the All England Lawn Tennis and Croquet Club.

Career

Table tennis
Jones was born in Kings Heath, Birmingham, England. Her parents were prominent table tennis players, her father, Adrian Haydon, having been English number 1 and a competitor at world championships between 1928 and 1953. Ann, as a young girl, also took up the game, participating in five world championships in the 1950s, the best result being losing finalist in singles, doubles and mixed doubles all in Stockholm 1957. Soon after this she wrote the book Tackle Table Tennis This Way.

Jones also won two English Open titles in women's doubles as Haydon.

Tennis

She was also a powerful lawn tennis player, winning the 1954 and 1955 British junior championships. In 1956, she won the Wimbledon girls' singles championship.

Jones played lawn tennis in a highly competitive era that included some of the greatest female tennis players of all time, such as Billie Jean King, Margaret Court, and Maria Bueno. Despite the fierce competition, she won the 1961 French Championships, beating Margaret Smith, former champion Zsuzsa Körmöczy and Yola Ramirez and reached the final of the 1961 U.S. Championships, beating Wimbledon champion Angela Mortimer, losing to the defending champion Darlene Hard. In 1962, she married Philip F. Jones and played as Ann Haydon-Jones. A debilitating back and neck injury hampered her career in 1964/1965, yet she recovered sufficiently to reach the quarterfinals of the French championships in 1965, yet was controversially unseeded for that year's Wimbledon singles. This led to a fourth-round clash with the top-seeded defending champion Maria Bueno, which many thought was an imbalanced draw. Jones won the French title for a second time in 1966, beating Maria Bueno and Nancy Richey. She also won the Italian championships that year, beating Françoise Dürr and Annette Van Zyl.

At both the Wimbledon Championships and the U.S. Championships in 1967, Jones lost in the final to King. Two years later, however, the two again met in the Wimbledon final. This time, Jones took the most coveted title in the sport, making her the first left-handed female player to do so. She rounded off that year's Wimbledon by winning the mixed doubles championship with Australia's Fred Stolle. Her performances resulted in her being voted the BBC Sports Personality of the Year. Jones made Wimbledon 1969 her last Grand Slam singles event. She was seeded number one for the 1969 US Open but withdrew before the tournament began. She radically reduced her playing schedule for 1970, playing in South Africa where she won the Orange Free State Championships and the Western Province Championships. She then largely played only events in the United Kingdom for the remainder of the year. She returned to the international scene to play the Federation Cup event in Australia, where she partnered Virginia Wade on the British team. In 1971, Jones played on the Virginia Slims circuit, winning the U.S.$10,000 first prize for the event staged in Las Vegas, beating King in the final. Jones more or less retired after this event as she was expecting her first child. However, Jones continued to play the occasional UK event and was part of the 1975 Wightman Cup team for Great Britain. In 1977, Jones teamed with Winnie Wooldridge to play doubles at Wimbledon.

According to Lance Tingay and Bud Collins, Jones was ranked in the world top 10 from 1957 through 1963 and from 1965 through 1970, reaching a career high of world No. 2 in these rankings in 1967 and 1969.

According to Mark Lewisohn in The Complete Beatles Recording Sessions, on 4 July 1969, The Beatles paused the dubbing session for their song "Golden Slumbers" to listen to Jones beat King for the Wimbledon title when live on radio.

With the dawn of the open era in 1968, Jones joined King and others to organise the first professional female touring group. In 1970, she was hired by the BBC as a guest commentator and worked with it for over three decades, occasionally commentating for tennis coverage on U.S. TV stations. Jones was chairwoman of the Women's International Tennis Council and for many years the British team captain for events such as the Federation and Wightman Cups.

Over her career, she reached six Wimbledon semifinals in addition to her two appearances in the final: in 1958, beating Maria Bueno and losing to defending champion Althea Gibson; 1960, beating Renee Schuurman Haygarth and losingto Sandra Reynolds; 1962, beating Billie Jean Moffitt and losing to eventual champion Karen Hantze Susman; 1963, losing to runner-up Billie Jean Moffitt; 1966, beating Nancy Richey and losing a three-set match to Maria Bueno' and 1968 losing, after leading by a set and a break, to holder Billie Jean King. In the U.S. Nationals, as well as her final appearances in 1961 and 1967, Ann Jones reached three semifinals: in 1959, beating second-seed Sandra Reynolds (Price) and losing to Christine Truman,; in 1963, beating second-seed Darlene Hard and losing 9–7 in the third set to eventual winner Maria Bueno; and in 1968, losing to eventual winner Virginia Wade.

As well as winning the French Championships twice, Jones reached three other French finals, beating Annette Van Zyl and losing to Nancy Richey in 1968, and beating Rosemary Casals and Lesley Turner and losing in three sets to Margaret Court in 1969. Of her three losing finals in the French championships, there was one which nearly added to her total of wins: 1963 when she led Lesley Turner 5–2 in the final set. She also reached the semifinals in 1957 aged 18, beating third seed Christiane Mercelis and losing a tough semifinal to Dorothy Head Knode, and in 1962 beating Jan Lehane and losing to Lesley Turner.

In the British Hard Courts championships, after losing in the finals in 1958 to Shirley Bloomer Brasher and 1960 to Christine Truman, she was undefeated from 1963 to 1966, winning finals against Norma Baylon, Jan Lehane, Annette Van Zyl and Virginia Wade. She was a stalwart in the Wightman Cup from 1957 (aged 18, beating Darlene Hard, then Wimbledon finalist) to 1967, 1970 and 1975, winning the deciding match in 1958 against Mimi Arnold when Britain won for the first time since 1930, taking both her singles against Billie Jean Moffitt and Nancy Richey in 1965 and overall winning nine singles and six doubles. Despite playing at a time when there were four other British winners of the French, Australian, US and Wimbledon titles, (Mortimer, Brasher, Truman and Wade), she was ranked no. 1 in the UK on seven occasions. Naturally a baseliner and effective as such on clay (Tiiu Kivi said it was like playing a brick wall that moved), she schooled herself to become a most effective net player, perhaps seen at her best when attacking Margaret Court to defeat in the Wimbledon semifinal of 1969. Apart from Althea Gibson, early in her career, there was not a leading player of her era that she did not beat on several occasions.

Personal life
In 1971 she published her tennis autobiography A Game to Love.

Jones caused something of a stir on 30 August 1962 when she married businessman Philip "Pip" Jones (1907–1993) who was 31 years her senior and five years older than her father. Pip Jones became the first Tour Director of the Virginia Slims Women's Tennis Tour in 1971. The couple's names later became a recurring gag on Monty Python's Flying Circus during its series run, wherein the Pythons frequently inserted "Ann Haydon-Jones and her husband Pip" into any sketch where a list of names was being read.

In 1969, West Bromwich Albion commended Ann Jones on her sporting success and stated that she and her husband were supporters of the club.

Awards
In 1985, Jones was voted into the International Tennis Hall of Fame. For many years, Jones was chairwoman of the International Women's Tennis Council and has long been a member of Wimbledon's Committee of Management. She became the first 'civilian woman' (i.e., not a member of the British Royal Family) to present the trophies at Wimbledon when she awarded the winners of the Mixed Doubles championship their cup in 2007, a ceremony she now regularly performs. She also has presented the junior girls trophy.

Already a Member of the Order of the British Empire (MBE), Jones was appointed Commander of the Order of the British Empire (CBE) in the 2014 New Year Honours for services to tennis.

The stadium court at the Edgbaston Priory Tennis Club was renamed the Ann Jones Centre Court in 2013.

Grand Slam finals
Including:

Singles: 9 (3–6)

Doubles: 6 (3–3)

Mixed doubles: 6 (2–4)

Although both teams shared the 1969 Australian Open mixed doubles title, it is not counted in the official Grand Slam title count.

Grand Slam performance timelines

Singles

Doubles

Singles titles (113)
 1956 – Cheltenham, Sunderland Championships, Welsh Championships, Worthing Hard Courts, North of England Championships
 1957 – Tally-Ho! Open Tennis Championships, Northumberland County Championships, Malvern, Sunderland Championships, South of England Championships
 1958 – Tally-Ho! Open Tennis Championships, Durham
 1959 – Mexico City, Pan American Championships
 1960 – Finnish Championships, Scandinavian Indoor Championships, German Indoors, Good Neighbor Championships Miami, St. Petersburg Masters, Caribe Hilton International, Mexico City, St. Andrew's Invitations Kingston, Caribbean Championships, Tally-Ho! Open Tennis Championships, Sutton Hard Courts, Malvern Championships, Cologne Championships, Essex County Championships, Pacific Southwest Championships, Championships of Morocco, Palace Hotel Covered Courts Championships.
 1961 – Good Neighbor Championships Miami, French Championships, Wolverhampton Open, Lowther Championships, Irish Championships, Welsh Championships, Canadian Championships, Chilean National Championships, São Paulo Championships
 1962 – Western Province Championships, Hewlett's Hard Courts Durban, French Indoors, Scandinavian Indoor Championships, British Covered Court Championships, Cumberland Hard Court Championships, Sutton Hard Courts, London Hard Court Championships, East Gloucestershire Championships, Midland Championships (shared), Welsh Championships, St. Moritz.
 1963 – Coupe Pierre Gillou, German Indoors, Scandinavian Indoor Championships, French Indoors, Carlton International, Sutton Championships, British Hard Court Championships, London Hard Court Championships, Wolverhampton Open, East Gloucestershire Championships, Hoylake Open, Carlyon Bay Championships
 1964 – British Hard Court Championships, Sutton Coldfield, Surrey Championships, Bavarian Championships, British Covered Court Championships, Carlyon Bay Covered Courts, Palace Hotel Covered Courts Championships
 1965 – German Indoors, French Indoors, Dutch Indoor, Cumberland Championships, Sutton Hard Courts, British Hard Courts, British Covered Court Championships, Carlyon Bay Covered Courts, Palace Hotel Covered Courts Championships
 1966 – German Indoors, French Indoors, Cumberland Championships, British Hard Courts, Connaught Hard Court Championships, Italian Championships, French Championships, Moscow International
 1967 – German Indoors, Scandinavian Indoor Championships, Dixie International Championships, Barranquilla Championships, Caracas Championships, Curaçao Invitational, Pan Amercian Championshipss, Caribe Hilton International, Masters Invitational, Kent Championships, Essex Championships
 1968 – Caracas, Queen's Club (shared), Argentine & South American Open
 1969 – New Zealand Open, Monte Carlo Open, Belgian Open, Queen's Club Championships, Wimbledon, Aix-en-Provence Golden Racket Trophy , British Covered Court Championships
 1970 – Orange Free State Championships, Western Province Championships, Benson & Hedges Open, Bio-Strath London Hard Court Championships, Surrey Grass Court Championships, Chichester International, Eastbourne International, Turkish International Championships, Dewar Cup Torquay
 1971 – Caribe Hilton International, Caesar's Palace World Pro
 1975 – Slazenger Torquay Open

See also
 Performance timelines for all female tennis players who reached at least one Grand Slam final
 List of England players at the World Team Table Tennis Championships

References

External links

 
 
 
 

1938 births
Living people
Australian Open (tennis) champions
BBC Sports Personality of the Year winners
BBC sports presenters and reporters
Commanders of the Order of the British Empire
English female tennis players
French Championships (tennis) champions
French Open champions
Grand Slam (tennis) champions in girls' singles
Grand Slam (tennis) champions in mixed doubles
Grand Slam (tennis) champions in women's doubles
Grand Slam (tennis) champions in women's singles
International Tennis Hall of Fame inductees
Sportspeople from Birmingham, West Midlands
Tennis commentators
Wimbledon champions
British female tennis players
Tennis people from the West Midlands (county)
Wimbledon junior champions